Alan Saret (born 1944, New York City) is an American sculptor, draftsman, and installation artist, best known for his Postminimalism wire sculptures and drawings. He lives and works in Brooklyn.

Education 
Saret graduated from Cornell University in 1966 with a degree in architecture.

Career 
Saret was a vital part of the Soho alternative art scene in the late 1960s and 1970s, as well as an important figure in the history of systems art, process art, generative art and post-conceptual art. In the 1980s, Saret removed himself from the commercial art world. He lived in India from 1971 to 1973.

Saret's work is held in the permanent collections of several museums, including the Princeton University Art Museum, the Morgan Library and Museum, the Kemper Art Museum, the University of Michigan Museum of Art, the High Museum of Art, the Brooklyn Museum, the Whitney Museum of American Art, the Metropolitan Museum of Art, the BAMPFA, the Blanton Museum of Art, the Harvard Art Museums, the Herbert F. Johnson Museum of Art, the Denver Art Museum, the Detroit Institute of Arts, the Albright-Knox Art Gallery, the Museum of Contemporary Art Chicago, the Glenstone, the Museum of Contemporary Art, the Saint Louis Art Museum, the Museum of Modern Art, the Art Institute of Chicago, and the Modern Art Museum of Fort Worth.

Footnotes

External links 
Artnet bio 

Living people
Postmodern artists
Sculptors from New York (state)
American installation artists
American conceptual artists
1944 births
Cornell University College of Architecture, Art, and Planning alumni
American draughtsmen
20th-century American sculptors
20th-century American male artists
21st-century American sculptors